Peter Graham is the name of:

Arts and entertainment
Peter Graham (composer) (born 1958), British composer
Peter Benjamin Graham (1925–1987), Australian visual artist and art theorist
Peter Sebastian Graham (born 1970), Australian artist
Peter Graham (1939–2020), British writer, restaurant critic

Politics
Peter Graham (Conservative MPP) (1827–1877), British-born Ontario farmer and political figure, MPP for Frontenac
Peter Graham (Liberal MPP) (1821–1900), English-born Ontario farmer and political figure, MPP for Lambton East
Peter Graham (Manitoba politician)

Sports
Peter Graham (cricketer, born 1920) (1920–2000), Indian-born British cricketer
Peter Graham (cricketer, born 1954) (1954–2015), British cricketer
Peter Graham (footballer) (born 1947), British footballer
Peter Graham (fighter) (born 1975), Australian kickboxer, boxer and mixed martial artist
Peter Graham (rugby league), Australian rugby league footballer of the 1990s

Other people
Sir Peter Graham (barrister) (1934–2019), British lawyer and parliamentary draftsman
Peter Graham (judge) (born 1940), Justice of the Federal Court of Australia
Peter Graham (New Zealand mountaineer) (1881–1961), who together with Henrik Sillem made the first ascent of the West Ridge of Mount Cook
Peter Graham (British Army officer) (born 1937)
Peter Graham, of the League for a Workers' Republic

See also